Tucker v News Media Ownership Ltd HC Wellington CP477/86 [1986] NZHC 216; [1986] 2 NZLR 716  is a cited case in New Zealand regarding claims for breach of privacy and infliction of emotional distress

References

High Court of New Zealand cases
New Zealand tort case law
1986 in case law
1986 in New Zealand law